A ring laser gyroscope (RLG) consists of a ring laser having two independent counter-propagating resonant modes over the same path; the difference in phase is used to detect rotation. It operates on the principle of the Sagnac effect which shifts the nulls of the internal standing wave pattern in response to angular rotation. Interference between the counter-propagating beams, observed externally, results in motion of the standing wave pattern, and thus indicates rotation.

Description
The first experimental ring laser gyroscope was demonstrated in the US by Macek and Davis in 1963.  Various organizations worldwide subsequently developed ring-laser technology further. Many tens of thousands of RLGs are operating in inertial navigation systems and have established high accuracy, with better than 0.01°/hour bias uncertainty, and mean time between failures in excess of 60,000 hours.

Ring laser gyroscopes can be used as the stable elements (for one degree of freedom each) in an inertial reference system. The advantage of using an RLG is that there are no moving parts (apart from the dither motor assembly (see further description below), and laser-lock), compared to the conventional spinning gyroscope. This means there is no friction, which eliminates a significant source of drift. Additionally, the entire unit is compact, lightweight and highly durable, making it suitable for use in mobile systems such as aircraft, missiles, and satellites. Unlike a mechanical gyroscope, the device does not resist changes to its orientation.

Contemporary applications of the Ring Laser Gyroscope (RLG) include an embedded GPS capability to further enhance accuracy of RLG Inertial Navigation Systems (INS) on military aircraft, commercial airliners, ships, and spacecraft. These hybrid INS/GPS units have replaced their mechanical counterparts in most applications. 

Ring laser gyroscopes (RLG) have demonstrated to currently be the most sensitive device for testing rotational motion with respect to an inertial frame. A new era for upscaled ring laser gyroscopes started in the 1990s when, thanks to the technological improvements in the production of low loss mirrors, a reflectivity exceeding 99.99% was achieved. Unlocked Earth rotation sensing with a ring laser of about 1 m2 of area was demonstrated at the University of Canterbury in Christchurch, New Zealand

Principle of operation
According to the Sagnac effect, a certain rate of rotation induces a small difference between the time it takes light to traverse the ring in the two directions. This introduces a tiny separation between the frequencies of the counter-propagating beams, a motion of the standing wave pattern within the ring, and thus a beat pattern when those two beams interfere outside the ring. Therefore, the net shift of that interference pattern follows the rotation of the unit in the plane of the ring.

RLGs, while more accurate than mechanical gyroscopes, suffer from an effect known as "lock-in" at very slow rotation rates. When the ring laser is hardly rotating, the frequencies of the counter-propagating laser modes become almost identical. In this case, crosstalk between the counter-propagating beams can allow for injection locking, so that the standing wave "gets stuck" in a preferred phase, thus locking the frequency of each beam to that of the other, rather than responding to gradual rotation.

Forced dithering can largely overcome this problem. The ring laser cavity is rotated clockwise and anti-clockwise about its axis using a mechanical spring driven at its resonance frequency. This ensures that the angular velocity of the system is usually far from the lock-in threshold.  Typical rates are 400 Hz, with a peak dither velocity on the order of 1 degree per second. Dither does not fix the lock-in problem completely, as each time the direction of rotation is reversed, a short time interval exists in which the rotation rate is near zero and lock-in briefly can occur. If a pure frequency oscillation is maintained, these small lock-in intervals can accumulate. This was remedied by introducing noise to the 400 Hz vibration.

A different approach to avoiding lock-in is embodied in the Multioscillator Ring Laser Gyroscope, wherein what is effectively two independent ring lasers (each having two counterpropagating beams) of opposite circular polarization coexist in the same ring resonator. The resonator incorporates polarization rotation (via a nonplanar geometry) which splits the fourfold-degenerate cavity mode (two directions, two polarizations each) into right- and left-circular-polarized modes separated by many hundreds of MHz, each having two counterpropagating beams. Nonreciprocal bias via the Faraday effect, either in a special thin Faraday rotator, or via a longitudinal magnetic field on the gain medium, then further splits each circular polarization by typically a few hundred kHz, thus causing each ring laser to have a static output beat frequency of hundreds of kHz. One frequency increases and one decreases, when inertial rotation is present; the two frequencies are measured and then digitally subtracted to finally yield the net Sagnac-effect frequency splitting and thus determine the rotation rate. The Faraday bias frequency is chosen to be higher than any anticipated rotation-induced frequency difference, so the two counterpropagating waves have no opportunity to lock-in.

Fibre optic gyroscope
A related device is the fibre optic gyroscope which also operates on the basis of the Sagnac effect, but in which the ring is not a part of the laser. Rather, an external laser injects counter-propagating beams into an optical fiber ring, where rotation causes a relative phase shift between those beams when interfered after their pass through the fiber ring. The phase shift is proportional to the rate of rotation. This is less sensitive in a single traverse of the ring than the RLG, in which the externally observed phase shift is proportional to the accumulated rotation itself, not its derivative. However, the sensitivity of the fiber optic gyro is enhanced by having a long optical fiber, coiled  for compactness, in which the Sagnac effect is multiplied according to the number of turns.

Example applications
Airbus A320
Agni III and Agni-IV
Agni-V
ASM-135 US Anti-satellite missile
Boeing 757-200
Boeing 777
 B-52H with the AMI upgrade
EF-111 Raven
F-15E Strike Eagle
F-16 Fighting Falcon
HAL Tejas
MC-130E Combat Talon I and MC-130H Combat Talon II
MQ-1C Warrior
MK39 Ship's Internal Navigation System used in NATO surface ships and submarines
P3 Orion (with upgrade)
Shaurya missile.
MH-60R, MH-60S, SH60F and SH60B Seahawk helicopters
Sukhoi Su-30MKI
Trident I and Trident II Missiles
PARALIGN, used for roller alignment
International Space Station
JF-17 Thunder

See also 

 Accelerometer
 Active laser medium
 Hemispherical resonator gyroscope
 Laser construction
 Laser science
 List of laser applications
 List of laser types
 Optical ring resonators
 Fibre optic gyroscope

References

External links
Canterbury Ring Laser Research Group
Weapons and Systems Engineering Department, United States Naval Academy
 

Gyroscopes
Optical devices
Laser applications
Missile technology
Spacecraft attitude control